Makhdoom Shahabuddin, is a Pakistani journalist, columnist and activist. He is currently working as a Program Anchor on BOL Network and hosts prime-time TV Show "Ab Baat Hogi". He has worked as an anchorperson for several Pakistani news channels such as Hum News and PTV News.
In 2019, Shahabuddin received the Agahi Award for his article about child pornography in Pakistan. He writes columns for Pakistani daily newspapers, including the Pakistan Observer, Daily Times and several other national publications. Shahabuddin also is a political commentator on YouTube with over 1 million subscribers.

Early life and career
Shahabuddin was born in Sargodha into the Makhdoom family, a Sufi Muslim clan widely respected in South Asia. He got his early education in Sargodha and joined Chand Bagh School, an elite boarding school in Pakistan during his high school years. He then did his Civil Engineering from  National University of Sciences & Technology. His interest then shifted from engineering to the media industry and Shahabuddin completed media courses from BBC, Aljazeera Media Institute, British Council etc. He worked as a news presenter and TV host in various news channels of Pakistan including PTV Home and Hum News. He is considered among the pioneers of digital media journalism in Pakistan.

Shahabuddin moved to Europe to pursue Erasmus Mundus Masters in Media, Journalism and Globalisation from Aarhus University in Denmark and Charles University in Prague, Czech Republic.

Harassment by Pakistani Government
Shahabuddin who is critical of corruption by government and the powerful Pakistani military establishment was harassed by officials as they threatened to arrest Shahabuddin, involve him in false criminal cases, and ruin his life, due to his vocal criticism of their actions. He filed a writ petition in Lahore High Court filed under Article 199 of the Constitution of Pakistan. The court agreed with the petitioner’s argument and directed the respondents to remain within the four corners of the law and not to cause any sort of harassment to the petitioner and his family members.

Shahab Leaks
In June 2021, Shahabuddin revealed in a video that Hamid Mir’s verified social media accounts were being operated from in India. After the video was uploaded on social media, his Facebook page was temporarily disabled and appeared again after the removal of the Indian administrator from the panel. Social media users applauded Shahabuddin for exposing Hamid Mir and #ShahabLeaks became the top trend on Pakistani Twitter.

References

External links 
 

Pakistani male journalists
Living people
Pakistani columnists
Pakistani investigative journalists
People from Sargodha District
1997 births